Freakshow is an American unscripted reality documentary television series from AMC that chronicles the operations of former music producer Todd Ray's Venice Beach Freakshow. The series premiered on February 14, 2013, preceded by the mid-season premiere of Comic Book Men and followed by the series premiere of Immortalized. The show was given a greenlight along with Immortalized on August 16, 2012. It was announced in April 2013 that the series had been renewed for a second season, which premiered on May 6, 2014.

Cast

 Todd Ray
 Danielle Ray
 Asia Ray
 Phoenix Ray
 Amazing Ali
 Brianna Belladonna "The Indestructible Woman"
 George Bell "The Tallest Man In America"
 Marcus "Creature"
 Morgue 
 Murrugun "The Mystic"
 Jessa "The Bearded Lady"
 Wee Matt

 Dirty Kerr
 Angeli
Chayne Hultgren 'The Space Cowboy'

Episodes

Season 1 (2013)

Season 2 (2014)

References

External links

2010s American reality television series
2013 American television series debuts
2014 American television series endings
English-language television shows
AMC (TV channel) original programming
Television series by Endemol